Louis Philippe de Bombelles (1 July 17807 July 1843) was an Austrian count and diplomat.

Early life 
Born in 1780 in Regensburg, he was a member of the noble Bombelles family. He was the son of the French nobleman Marc Marie, Marquis de Bombelles and Baroness Marie Angélique de Mackau.

Biography 
He was brought up in Naples and was briefly an officer here. He served as attaché for Klemens von Metternich in Berlin (1804), chargé d'affaires in Berlin (1813), and ambassador in Copenhagen (1814-16), where he married the performer, Ida Brun. He was transferred to Dresden, where his house was a center for the city's musical life. In 1819, he participated in the Karlsbad Congress. Later, he was ambassador at several Italian courts and eventually (in 1837) in Bern. He died in 1843 in Vienna.

References

Elisabeth Droß (Hg.): Quellen zur Ära Metternich, (Ausgewählte Quellen zur deutschen Geschichte der Neuzeit, Bd. 23a), Darmstadt : Wissenschaftliche Buchgesellschaft 1999.
Bombelles Ludwig Philipp Graf. In: Österreichisches Biographisches Lexikon 1815–1950 (ÖBL). Band 1. Verlag der Österreichischen Akademie der Wissenschaften, Wien 1957, S. 101.
Hellmuth Rößler: Bombelles, Ludwig Philipp Graf von. In: Neue Deutsche Biographie (NDB). Band 2, Duncker & Humblot, Berlin 1955, S. 440 f. (Digitalisat).
Albert Portmann-Tinguely: Ludwig Philipp von Bombelles im Historischen Lexikon der Schweiz

1780 births
1843 deaths
People from Regensburg
Counts of Austria
French nobility
Austrian diplomats
Ambassadors of Austria to Switzerland
de Bombelles family